The Boston mayoral election of 1893 saw the reelection of Nathan Matthews Jr. to a fourth consecutive term.

While the campaigning had been energetic ahead of the election it was noted that the election day itself was rather quiet in the city of Boston.

Results

See also
List of mayors of Boston, Massachusetts

References

Mayoral elections in Boston
Boston
Boston mayoral
19th century in Boston